The Humanitarian Coordinator is the senior-most United Nations official in a country experiencing a humanitarian emergency. The Humanitarian Coordinator is appointed by the United Nations Emergency Relief Coordinator when a new emergency occurs or an existing humanitarian situation "worsens in degree and/or complexity".

In most cases, the function is performed by the United Nations Resident Coordinator.

The Humanitarian Coordinator is supported in almost every case by a local OCHA Office.

The Role of the Humanitarian Coordinator

Leadership: The Humanitarian Coordinator & Humanitarian Country Team 
When a humanitarian crisis occurs, the United Nations Office for Coordination of Humanitarian Affairs (UN OCHA) strives to efficiently mobilize and coordinate aid. The leader of the UN OCHA, the Emergency Relief Coordinator (ERC), appoints a Humanitarian Coordinator (HC) (also known as the Resident Coordinator (RC) within the country of crisis to establish and lead the Humanitarian Country Team (HCT). The HCT’s job is to assess the situation, identify and prioritize needs of victims, and estimate the capacity of the country and its people to respond.

Purpose: The Importance of Identifying & Prioritizing Needs 
In Goma during 1994, many of the failures in aid can be attributed to duplicated services from international aid organizations and wasted resources. The Sphere Project was created after that event in order to create a more coherent system of humanitarian aid organizations that could be mobilized when needed. Before aid is sent, the HC and HCT perform an initial assessment in order to determine which clusters of aid organizations should be recommended for activation within the country. This way, only the aid that is needed as determined by the HC is sent to the country.

Assessment: Methods for Prioritizing Needs 
The HC appoints a team of emergency specialists to perform a multi-cluster initial rapid assessment (MIRA) during the first weeks of a crisis. The team’s primary goals are to create a Preliminary Scenario Definition after 72 hours and a full MIRA report after two weeks that inform humanitarian stakeholders of what resources are needed to address basic needs. Recommended criteria for the reports include descriptions of the general situation of the population, the geographic spread of the disaster, the current state of health problems and infrastructure, and data on the abundance and quality of food, water, shelter, safety, education, and coordination. This information is gathered through traditional surveys, call detail records, and migration models using mobile phone usage patterns. New technologies such as mobile Vulnerability Analysis and Mapping (mVAM) have also been recently developed in order to more efficiently collect information remotely from victims of the crisis via text, voice calls, and an interactive voice response system. These types of technologies have been fairly effective since they are able to collect data offline and then upload information once they reach an area of active WIFI during a humanitarian crisis. This has led to a larger and more detailed body of data that help humanitarian relief managers “fine tune interventions and prioritize resources on the basis of a bird’s eye view of the operation.” Through these improvements in assessment tools within the MIRA process, the HC is more capable of effectively submitting recommendations to the ERC concerning which cluster groups of aid organizations should be recruited to provide resources and assist victims.

Current Humanitarian Coordinators 

United Nations posts
United Nations Development Programme